The Men's 3 metre springboard competition at the 2017 World Championships was held on 19 and 20 July 2017. In a surprise finish, the top three men from the semifinals all failed to reach the podium.

Results
The preliminary round was started on 19 July at 10:00. The semifinals were held on 19 July at 15:30. The final was held on 20 July at 18:30.

Green denotes finalists

Blue denotes semifinalists

References

Men's 3 metre springboard